Rostami (also Romanized as Rostamī; also known as Bandar-e Rostamī and Rustami) is a port in Busheher, Delvar District, Tangestan County, Bushehr Province, Iran. At the 2006 census, its population was 1,427, in 341 families.

References 

Populated places in Tangestan County